Japanese is an East Asian language spoken by about 126 million people, primarily in Japan, where it is the official language and national language. The influx of Japanese loanwords can be classified into two periods, Japanese colonial administration period (1942–1945) and globalisation of Japanese popular culture (1980-now). As Indonesian is written using Latin script, Japanese romanisation systems influence the spelling in Indonesian.

Spelling

Consonants

Vowels
Most vowels are retained without significant change in Indonesian, except in vowels length and pitch accent (there are no vowels length distinction and no pitch accent in Indonesian).

Loanwords

A

B

C

D

E

F

G

H

I

J

K

M

N

O

P

R

S

T

U

W

Y

Z

Bibliography 

 Badudu, J.S; Kamus Kata-kata Serapan Asing Dalam Bahasa Indonesia; Kompas, Jakarta, 2003
 Kamus Besar Bahasa Indonesia, Departemen Pendidikan dan Kebudayaan, Jakarta, Balai Pustaka: 1999, halaman 1185 s.d. 1188 berisikan Pendahuluan buku Senarai Kata Serapan dalam Bahasa Indonesia, Departemen Pendidikan dan Kebudayaan, Jakarta, 1996 (dengan sedikit penyaduran tanpa mengubah maksud dan tujuan seseungguhnya dari buku ini).

References

Indonesia culture-related lists
Indonesian language